Waldsteinia fragarioides (syn. Dalibarda fragarioides Michx. and Geum fragarioides,  also called Appalachian barren strawberry, or just barren strawberry, is a low, spreading plant with showy yellow flowers that appear in early spring. This plant is often used as an underplanting in perennial gardens.

In some ways the appearance is similar to other low plants of the rose family such as Fragaria (strawberries) or Potentilla indica (Indian strawberry), but it lacks runners and has more rounded leaves.

It is native to eastern North America, from Minnesota, Ontario, Quebec, and Maine south to Indiana and Pennsylvania (and as far south as North Carolina in the mountains).

It is evergreen.

Conservation status in the United States 
It is listed endangered in Connecticut, Illinois, and Maine, as threatened in New Hampshire, as a special concern in Massachusetts, and as rare in Indiana.

Native American ethnobotany
The Iroquois take a compound decoction of  the plants  as a blood remedy, and apply a poultice of the smashed plants to snakebites.

References

External links
Waldsteinia fragarioides
Waldsteinia fragarioides (in French)

Colurieae
Flora of New Jersey
Groundcovers
Plants used in traditional Native American medicine
Flora without expected TNC conservation status